West Baldwin Reservoir (or Injebreck Reservoir, locally) is a reservoir on the Isle of Man, about  north of Douglas which it supplies.  It was constructed by building a dam across a valley, and flooding the valley.  Remains of a village in the valley can still be seen when the reservoir level is low.  It is operated by the Isle of Man Water Authority.

History
Construction of the dam started in 1900 by the Douglas Corporation Water Works Department.  A railway was first built, including nine wooden bridges over the River Glen, to transport the required material to site.  The construction was finished in 1904.

Dam
The reservoir's dam was completed in 1904. There is a vertical puddle clay core supported by zoned earth fill shoulders. The higher part of the upstream shoulder is faced in dry rubble pitching about 60 centimetres  (2 ft) thick. The crest and downstream shoulder are grassed.

Use
The reservoir supplies Douglas, Onchan and the south of the island.  Water can also be pumped from the Sulby Reservoir.

References

External links
 Isle of Man reservoirs

Bodies of water of the Isle of Man